Eupoecilia acrographa is a species of moth of the family Tortricidae. It is found in Australia (Queensland and New South Wales).

The wingspan is 12 mm. The forewings are ochreous whitish. The hindwings are pale grey.

References

Moths described in 1916
Eupoecilia